Arbanaška is a village in the municipality of Prokuplje, Serbia. According to the 2002 census, the village has a population of 51 people.

See also 
 Arbanaška River, a river in Serbia
 Arbanaška Mountain, a mountain in Serbia
 Arbanaško Hill ("Arbanaška Hill"), a hill in Serbia
 Arbanasi (disambiguation)
 Arbëreshë (disambiguation)

References

Populated places in Toplica District